Drone ship may refer to:
 An autonomous spaceport drone ship or ASDS, used by SpaceX as a sea-borne rocket landing platform
 An unmanned surface vehicle, any unpiloted ship